Paul Martin Butcher (born November 8, 1963) is a former American football linebacker in the National Football League (NFL) for eleven years, until he retired from the Oakland Raiders.  He also played for the Detroit Lions, Los Angeles Rams, Indianapolis Colts, and he was selected by the Carolina Panthers in the 1995 NFL Expansion Draft.  He played college football at Wayne State University. Butcher was the Special Teams coach of the XFL's New York/New Jersey Hitmen. His son is the actor Paul Butcher.

References

1963 births
Living people
American football linebackers
Wayne State Warriors football players
Detroit Lions players
Los Angeles Rams players
Indianapolis Colts players
Carolina Panthers players
Oakland Raiders players
New York/New Jersey Hitmen coaches
Players of American football from Detroit